Baskerville is a serif typeface designed in the 1750s by John Baskerville (1706–1775) in Birmingham, England, and cut into metal by punchcutter John Handy. Baskerville is classified as a transitional typeface, intended as a refinement of what are now called old-style typefaces of the period, especially those of his most eminent contemporary, William Caslon.

Compared to earlier designs popular in Britain, Baskerville increased the contrast between thick and thin strokes, making the serifs sharper and more tapered, and shifted the axis of rounded letters to a more vertical position. The curved strokes are more circular in shape, and the characters became more regular. These changes created a greater consistency in size and form, influenced by the calligraphy Baskerville had learned and taught as a young man. Baskerville's typefaces remain very popular in book design and there are many modern revivals, which often add features such as bold type which did not exist in Baskerville's time.

As Baskerville's typefaces were proprietary to him and sold to a French publisher after his death, some designs influenced by him were made by British punchcutters. The Fry Foundry of Bristol created a version, probably cut by their typefounder Isaac Moore. Marketed in the twentieth century as "Fry's Baskerville" or "Baskerville Old Face", a digitisation based on the more delicate larger sizes is included with some Microsoft software.

History

Baskerville's typeface was part of an ambitious project to create books of the greatest possible quality. Baskerville was a wealthy industrialist, who had started his career as a writing-master (teacher of calligraphy) and carver of gravestones, before making a fortune as a manufacturer of varnished lacquer goods. At a time when books in England were generally printed to a low standard, using typefaces of conservative design, Baskerville sought to offer books created to higher-quality methods of printing than any before, using carefully made, level presses, a high quality of ink and very smooth paper pressed after printing to a glazed, gleaming finish.

While Baskerville's types in some aspects recall the general design of William Caslon, the most eminent punchcutter of the time, his approach was far more radical. Beatrice Warde, John Dreyfus and others have written that aspects of his design recalled his handwriting and common elements of the calligraphy taught by the time of Baskerville's youth, which had been used in copperplate engraving but had not previously been cut into type in Britain. Such details included many of the intricate details of his italic, such as the flourishes on the capital N and entering stroke at top left of the italic 'p'. He had clearly considered the topic of ideal letterforms for many years, since a slate carved in his early career offering his services cutting tombstones, believed to date from around 1730, is partly cut in lettering very similar to his typefaces of the 1750s. The result was a typeface cut by Handy to Baskerville's specifications that reflected Baskerville's ideals of perfection. According to Baskerville, he developed his printing projects for seven years, releasing a prospectus advertisement for the project in 1754, before finally releasing his first book, an edition of Virgil, in 1757, which was followed by other classics. At the start of his edition of Paradise Lost, he wrote a preface explaining his ambitions.

In 1758, he was appointed University Printer to the Cambridge University Press. It was there in 1763 that he published his master work, a folio Bible.

Reception

The crispness of Baskerville's work seems to have unsettled (or perhaps provoked jealousy in) his contemporaries, and some claimed the stark contrasts in his printing damaged the eyes. Baskerville was never particularly successful as a printer, being a printer of specialist and elite editions, something not helped by the erratic standard of editing in his books. Abroad, however, he was much admired (if not directly imitated, at least not his style of type design), notably by Pierre Simon Fournier, Giambattista Bodoni and Benjamin Franklin (who had started his career as a printer), who wrote him a letter praising his work. His work was later admired in England by Thomas Frognall Dibdin, who wrote that 'in his Italic letter...he stands unrivalled; such elegance, freedom and perfect symmetry being in vain to be looked for among the specimens of Aldus and Colinaeus...Baskerville was a truly original artist, he struck out a new method of printing in this country and may be considered as the founder of that luxuriant style of typography at present so generally prevails; and which seems to have attained perfection in the neatness of Whittingham, the elegance of Bulmer and the splendour of Bensley." Thomas Curson Hansard in 1825 seems to have had misgivings about his work, praising his achievement in some ways but also suggesting that he was a better printer than a type designer. On his death his widow Sarah eventually sold his material to a Paris literary society connected to Beaumarchais, placing them out of reach of British printing. A. F. Johnson however cautions that some perhaps over-patriotic British writers on type design have over-estimated Baskerville's influence on continental type design: "there seems to be no trace of a Baskerville school outside Great Britain, except of course in the use of actual Baskerville types. Didot proceeded from the "romains du roi" and would have so proceeded if Baskerville had never printed. Even in England, where there was a Baskerville period in typography, the modern face came from the French, and not as a development from Baskerville."

Baskerville's styles of type and printing, although initially unpopular in Britain, proved influential for a brief transitional period in the late eighteenth and early nineteenth century, with printers and type designers such as Joseph Fry, Isaac Moore who may have been Fry's punchcutter, and Wilson of Glasgow. Bulmer, cut by the brother of Baskerville's foremen, was one design inspired by it, as is the Bell type cut by Richard Austin. Austin's biographer Alastair Johnston has described this period as a "glorious but short-lived" period of innovative type design in Britain "of harmonious types that had the larger-on-the-body proportions of the Romain du Roi, with the modelling of Baskerville but more colour and fine serifs". Philip Gaskell particularly highlights as a successful typeface of this period the Wilson foundry of Glasgow's 'startling' English-sized (14 pt) roman of 1760, following soon from Baskerville's first editions of 1757 and cut extremely large for its point size: "Baskerville's influence is obvious, but Wilson has outdone the master in the width, weight and even the size of the face. I think myself that with its large x-height, generous width and clean execution, this elegant fount carries out Baskerville's ideas better than did Baskerville himself." This period saw an increasing influence of Didone printing from the Continent, in particular the types of the Didot family and the editions published by Bodoni. The style then disappeared from view altogether following a full trend towards Didone typefaces, often with a much darker style of impression; Updike suggests that this change mostly happened around 1815–20. The Scotch Roman genre which proved popular in Britain and America is something of an intermediate between Didone typefaces and Baskerville's influence. The succession of more extreme "Didone" typefaces quickly replacing Baskerville's style has led to Baskerville being called "transitional" on the road to the Didone style which dominated printing for a long period, although of course Baskerville would not have considered his design "transitional" but as a successful end in itself.

The original Baskerville type (with some replaced letters) was revived in 1917 by Bruce Rogers, for the Harvard University Press, and also released by G. Peignot et Fils in Paris (France). Modern revivals have added features, such as italics with extra or no swashes and bold weights, that were not present in Baskerville's original work.

Baskerville is used widely in documents issued by the University of Birmingham (UK) and Castleton University (Vermont, USA). A modified version of Baskerville is also prominently used in the Canadian government's corporate identity program—namely, in the 'Canada' wordmark.  Another modified version of Baskerville is used by Northeastern University (USA), and the ABRSM.

Characteristics

Key features of Baskerville are its E where the bottom arm projects further than the upper, a W with no centre serif, and in the lower-case g where the bottom loop is open. Some fonts cut for Baskerville have an 'R' with a straight leg; in others it is curved. Many characters have clear ball terminals, in contrast to the more wedge-shaped serifs of earlier fonts. Most distinctive is the italic, in which the J has a centre-bar and many other italic capitals have flourishes, the 'p' has a tail pointing downwards and to the left (similar to the entrance stroke that would be made with a pen) and the w has a clear centre loop and swash on the left. In general, Baskerville's type has been described as 'rounder, more sharply cut' than its predecessors. (Some of these distinctive features are discarded in many revivals, as seen below.) Baskerville's type featured text figures or lower-case numbers, the only form which was used at the time (Roman numerals would be used to align with the capitals). The capitals are very bold, and (like Caslon's) have been criticised for being unbalanced to the lower-case at large sizes.

Baskerville also produced a font for Greek, which survives at Oxford. It has sometimes been criticised as unidiomatic, and has not been particularly popular. He also had cut ornaments, many apparently copied or influenced from those offered by the Enschedé type foundry of Haarlem.

Metal type versions

The following foundries offered versions of Baskerville:
 The original punches were sold by Baskerville's widow and eventually ended up in the possession of G. Peignot et Fils by way of Beaumarchais. Charles Peignot donated them to Cambridge University Press in 1953.
 With Baskerville's equipment unavailable in France, the Fry type foundry of Bristol cut its own version in the late eighteenth century, presumably by typefounder Isaac Moore who also showcased them on his own specimen. These designs feature a slightly different 'a' at large sizes followed in many revivals. Mosley comments that "In its larger sizes it is one of the most elegant types which have ever been cut, and it is by no means a simple derivative. The curves of the lower-case letters are flatter than Baskerville's and the serifs are slightly more tapered." It was showcased in a specimen attached to a 1787 reprint of John Smith's Printer's Grammar, in which it was frankly admitted that "The plan on which they first sat out was an improvement of the Types of the late Mr. Baskerville of Birmingham" but, presumably failing to achieve sufficient popularity, they additionally created copies of Caslon's types.
 When Fry's successors closed, this version was acquired and issued (and some sizes possibly recut) by Stephenson Blake under the name "Baskerville Old Face", with many imitations following its design, often adding lining figures at cap height and the cropped descenders necessary for "standard line" American printing.
 The Fry Foundry version was also copied by American Type Founders. Finding Moore's italic unsatisfactory, they added an italic based on the slightly later Bell typeface cut by Richard Austin.
 The British Monotype Corporation cut a copy of Baskerville in 1923 for its hot metal typesetting system, showcased in Penrose's Annual of 1924; it was extremely popular for printing in Britain during the twentieth century. As with other Monotype revivals, the design is sometimes called Baskerville MT. It is bundled with OS X in a somewhat slender digitisation.
 Schriftgießerei D. Stempel issued a revival in 1926 under the name "Original-Baskerville".
 Linotype AG, the German arm of Mergenthaler Linotype, adapted the Stempel cutting of the face for linecasting in 1927.
 Linotype's Baskerville was cut in 1923 by George W. Jones, though it was subsequently re-cut in 1936. A bold version was cut by Chauncey H. Griffith in 1939. It may sometimes be called Baskerville LT.

More loosely, the Scotch Roman genre of transitional types reflects the influence of Baskerville's work, with increasing influence of Didone type from the continent around the beginning of the nineteenth century; the font Georgia is influenced by this genre. Due to the cachet of the name, other completely unrelated designs were named 'Baskerville' in the hot metal period.

Cold type versions

As it had been a standard type for many years, Baskerville was widely available in cold type. Alphatype, Autologic, Berthold, Compugraphic, Dymo, Star/Photon, Harris, Mergenthaler, MGD Graphic Systems, Varityper, Hell AG and Monotype, all sold the face under the name Baskerville, while Graphic Systems Inc. offered the face as Beaumont.

Digital versions

As a somewhat precise design that emphasises contrast between thick and thin strokes, modern designers may prefer different revivals for different text sizes, printing methods and onscreen display, since a design intended to appear elegant in large text sizes could look too spindly for body text. Factors which would be taken into account include compensation for size and ink spread, if any (the extent of which depends on printing methods and type of paper used; it does not occur on screens). Among digitisations, František Štorm's extremely complete range of versions is particularly praised for featuring three optical sizes, the text version having thicker strokes to increase legibility as metal type does. Meanwhile, the common digitisation of Baskerville Old Face bundled with many Microsoft products features dramatic contrasts between thin and thick strokes. This makes it most suited to headings, especially since it does not have an italic.

Another common question facing revivals is what to do with some letters such as 'N' in italics. On faithful revivals such as the Storm digitisation (shown at top right) they have a swash, but this may be thought too distracting for general use or to space poorly in all-caps text. Accordingly, many revivals substitute (or offer as an alternate) capitals without swashes.

Dieter Hofrichter, who assisted Günter Gerhard Lange in designing a Baskerville revival for Berthold around 1980, commented:
We went to Birmingham where we saw original prints by Baskerville. I was quite astounded by how sharp the printing of his specimens is. They are razor-sharp: it almost hurt your eyes to see them. So elegant and high-contrast! He showed in this way what he could achieve. That was Baskerville's ideal - but not necessarily right for today.

Many companies have provided digital releases (some of older Baskerville revivals), including Linotype, URW++, Bitstream and SoftMaker as well as many others. These may have varying features, for example some lacking small caps. Monotype Baskerville is installed on Macs as part of macOS, while many Windows computers receive Moore's adaptation under the name of Baskerville Old Face in the URW digitisation (that described above) without an italic or bold weight.

Adaptations

A particularly idiosyncratic Baskerville revival is Mrs Eaves (1996), designed by Zuzana Licko. Named after Baskerville's housekeeper-turned-wife, it uses a low x-height to create a bright page without reducing stroke width. Not intended for extended body text, it is often used on book titles and headings. It uses a variety of ligatures to create effects with linked characters. Licko later created a sans-serif companion, Mr. Eaves.

Big Moore by Matthew Carter is a recent, complex digitisation of the larger sizes of Isaac Moore's early adaptation, that often called Baskerville Old Face, adding an italic. Harriet is an adaptation by Okaytype inspired by American nineteenth-century printing.

Gallery 
Some examples of volumes published by Baskerville.

Notes

References

.

.
 - general survey of printing including of the years after Baskerville & his influence on printing. Many illustrations.

External links

Typophile: Baskerville
John Baskerville I Love Typography, Sep. 23, 2007
Open Baskerville – an open-source revival of Moore's Baskerville, without an italic

Transitional serif typefaces
Typefaces with text figures
Public domain typefaces
Typefaces with optical sizes
Letterpress typefaces
Photocomposition typefaces
Digital typefaces
Monotype typefaces
Typefaces and fonts introduced in 1757